Fort Snelling is an unorganized territory of Hennepin County in the U.S. state of Minnesota. It is named after historic Fort Snelling, which is located within its boundaries.  The district also includes Coldwater Spring park, Minneapolis-Saint Paul International Airport, parts of the Mississippi National River and Recreation Area, and several government facilities. As of the 2020 census the territory had a population of 322 people.

Geography 

The unorganized territory of Fort Snelling is just east of the city of Richfield. Historic Fort Snelling is located at the eastern end of the territory, near the confluence of the Mississippi River with the Minnesota River. It also borders Minneapolis to the north and Bloomington to the southwest, while across the Mississippi River is Saint Paul in Ramsey County, and across the Minnesota River are Mendota and Mendota Heights in Dakota County.

For postal purposes, the eastern portion addresses in the unorganized territory (including Terminal 1 of the Minneapolis St. Paul International Airport and the  Fort Snelling historic site) are in zip code 55111 with a Saint Paul mailing address, while addresses in the western part of the territory (including the airport's Terminal 2 and the Metropolitan Airports Commission offices) are in zip code 55450 and have a Minneapolis mailing address. According to the United States Census Bureau, this unorganized territory has a total area of 17.2 km2 (6.7 mi2). 16.5 km2 (6.4 mi2) of it is land and 0.8 km2 (0.3 mi2) of it is water.

Fort Snelling's territory contains numerous military and other federal facilities. These facilities include the current National Guard base at Fort Snelling, Fort Snelling National Cemetery, and the Minneapolis Veterans Health Administration Medical Center.

Several facilities belonging to Minnesota state government agencies such as the Minnesota Department of Transportation are also located in the territory, as are the headquarters and portions of Fort Snelling State Park and the Minnesota Valley National Wildlife Refuge.

Minneapolis–Saint Paul International Airport, however, includes most of the land area of the unorganized territory. Delta Air Lines Building C is located on the airport property and in Fort Snelling, and is used by the airline for northern and regional operations.

Demographics 

Fort Snelling was listed as an incorporated village during the 1890 Census.

Most people resident in the unorganized territory are service members stationed at the barracks at Fort Snelling. The number of troops stationed there has declined over the years; for example, between the 2000 and 2010 censuses the population dropped from 442 to 149. Since then, however, a small amount of private housing in the old fort's Upper Post area has been developed as housing aimed at veterans, and more is planned, so the population may increase again.

As of the census of 2020, 322 people resided in 239 households in the unorganized territory. 83.5% of households spoke English at home and 14.6% spoke Spanish.  The median household income was $18,594. 31.1% of the population was below the poverty line.

References 

 

Mississippi National River and Recreation Area
Unorganized territories in Minnesota
Populated places in Hennepin County, Minnesota
Minnesota populated places on the Mississippi River
Former municipalities in Minnesota